2000 World Cup can refer to:
The 2000 Rugby League World Cup
The 2000 Women's Rugby League World Cup
The 2000 Alpine Skiing World Cup
2000 Women's Cricket World Cup
 The 2000 FIFA Beach Soccer World Cup
 The 2000 FIFA Futsal World Cup
 The 2000 FIFA Club World Cup

See also
 2000 Continental Championships (disambiguation)
 2000 World Championships (disambiguation)
 2000 World Junior Championships (disambiguation)